Sydney Seymour Hyde Stanhope, 6th Earl of Harrington (27 September 1845 – 22 February 1866) was an English peer.

Born Mr Sydney Seymore Hyde Stanhope at Ashburnham House in Westminster, London, Stanhope was the second son of Leicester Stanhope, 5th Earl of Harrington and Elizabeth Williams Green, and only became heir to his father's peerage following the premature death of his brother Algernon Russell Gayleard Stanhope (1838–1847).

Stanhope inherited the Earldom in 1862, at the age of 16, following the death of his father.

Lord Harrington died 22 February 1866, aged 20; unmarried and without issue.

He was succeeded by his first cousin Charles Wyndham Stanhope, 7th Earl of Harrington.

References

1845 births
1866 deaths
6
Sidney
Younger sons of earls